The Book of Pooh: The Stories from the Heart is a 2001 American comedy compilation film based on the Playhouse Disney television series The Book of Pooh.

It contains 6 episodes, each of which focuses on one character. It is wrapped together by a loose plot in which the characters wait in Christopher Robin's room for his arrival. As is typical with the series, each episode features an original musical number. It is a compilation film composed of footage from the TV series.

This film was produced by Shadow Projects and released on both VHS and DVD on July 17, 2001, by Walt Disney Home Entertainment.

Plot 
Pooh, Piglet and Tigger literally pop out of the Book of Pooh into Christopher Robin's room, but can't find Christopher Robin there. Tigger decides to search for Christopher Robin's journal, in hopes of finding out where he's gone misunderstanding how journals work, but ends up making a real mess. While they're trying to clean up the room, Piglet notices that Christopher Robin had marked some chapters of the Book of Pooh with special bookmarks featuring each of his friends. As the story continues, Rabbit, Kessie and Eeyore each show up too and at one point, they're forced to hide when Christopher Robin's mother comes upstairs after hearing their voices and mistakes them for her son. One by one, the characters ask Mr. Narrator to read the book's stories for them, leading to the following episodes:
 "Over the Hill" (Pooh's Story)
 "Tigger's Replacement" (Piglet's Story)
 "Kessie Wises Up" (Kessie's Story)
 "The Greenhorn with a Green Thumb" (Rabbit's Story)
 "The Night of the Waking Tigger" (Tigger's Story)
 "Eeyore's Tailiversary" (Eeyore's Story)
At the end, Pooh and his friends clean up the mess they've made and go into hiding when Christopher Robin returns with his mother and after she leaves, they come out of hiding and Christopher Robin reveals that he was at soccer practice and had his journal with him all along. He begins to proceed reading them the stories he marked, but finds out that they had already read them. Tigger suggests that Christopher Robin should read his journal to them instead, in which he agrees, ending the movie.

Cast

Voice cast 
 Jim Cummings – Winnie the Pooh and Tigger
 Peter Cullen – Eeyore
 Ken Sansom – Rabbit
 John Fiedler – Piglet's speaking voice
Jeff Bennett - Piglet's singing voice    
 Andre Stojka – Owl
 Stephanie D'Abruzzo – Kessie

Live-action cast 
 Paul Tiesler – Christopher Robin
 Vicki Kenderes Eibner – Christopher Robin's Mom
 Roger L. Jackson – Mr. Narrator

Toys 
Toys were released based on the film available such as Happy Meal Promotion and Stuffed Toys as a McDonald's Happy Meal series from July 11 to August 9, 2001.

See also 
 "Winnie the Pooh" (song)

Notes

References

External links 

 The Book of Pooh: Stories from the Heart at MSN Movies

2001 direct-to-video films
2001 films
American children's adventure films
American children's fantasy films
Winnie-the-Pooh films
Films based on television series
American anthology films
Compilation films
Winnie the Pooh (franchise)
Films with screenplays by Jymn Magon
2000s English-language films
2000s American films